Jhonnatan Medina-Álvarez (born 12 January 1982) is a Venezuelan former professional tennis player.

A left-handed player from Caracas, Medina competed mostly in ITF Futures events, with the occasional appearance on the ATP Challenger Tour. He featured in the qualifying draw for an ATP Tour tournament in Delray Beach in 2005. His career high singles ranking of 370 in the world was attained in 2007.

Between 2001 and 2009, Medina appeared in 13 Davis Cup ties, from which he won eight singles rubbers.

Medina, the winner of two bronze medals at the 2002 Central American and Caribbean Games, also represented Venezuela at both the 2003 Pan American Games and 2007 Pan American Games.

Based in the United States since 2007, Medina became an American citizen in 2016 and is currently the Director of Tennis at Longwood University.

References

External links
 
 
 

1982 births
Living people
Venezuelan male tennis players
Central American and Caribbean Games medalists in tennis
Central American and Caribbean Games bronze medalists for Venezuela
Pan American Games competitors for Venezuela
Tennis players at the 2003 Pan American Games
Tennis players at the 2007 Pan American Games
Tennis players from Caracas
Venezuelan emigrants to the United States
Longwood University faculty
20th-century Venezuelan people
21st-century Venezuelan people